Habnamrah (also spelled Habnemra) is a village in northern Syria located west of Homs in the Homs Governorate. It is situated in the area known as Wadi al-Nasara ('valley of the Christians'). According to the Syria Central Bureau of Statistics, Habnamrah had a population of 2,110 in the 2004 census. Its inhabitants are predominantly Greek Orthodox Christians. The village has a Greek Orthodox Church.

References

Bibliography

 
 

Populated places in Talkalakh District
Eastern Orthodox Christian communities in Syria
Christian communities in Syria